Kuala Perlis may refer to:
Kuala Perlis
Kuala Perlis (state constituency), represented in the Perlis State Legislative Assembly